

Codes 

K